Omealca Municipality is a municipality of the state of Veracruz in Mexico. The municipal seat is Omealca.

Etymology
Omealca means place between two rivers in nahuatl, due to it being next to Blanco river and above a subterranean one.

Climate
Omealca's has a very diverse range of climates, as it is next to the state of Puebla and Oaxaca, meaning that besides having Veracruz's tropical climate, it also has Puebla's mountainous climate and Oaxaca's arid climate. 

Municipalities of Veracruz